Oxford Creek is a stream in McNairy County of the U.S. state of Tennessee. It is a tributary of Cypress Creek.

Oxford Creek has the name of Abel Oxford, a pioneer settler.

References

Rivers of McNairy County, Tennessee
Rivers of Tennessee